The Kunda culture, originating from the Swiderian culture, comprised mesolithic hunter-gatherer communities of the Baltic forest zone extending eastwards through Latvia into northern Russia, dating to the period 8500–5000 BC according to calibrated radiocarbon dating. The oldest known settlement of the Kunda culture in Estonia is Pulli. The Kunda culture was succeeded by the Narva culture, who used pottery and showed some traces of food production.

Culture

Most Kunda settlements are located near the edge of the forests beside rivers, lakes, or marshes. Elk were extensively hunted, perhaps helped by trained domestic hunting-dogs. On the coast seal hunting is represented. Pike and other fish were taken from the rivers. There is a rich bone and antler industry, especially in relation to fishing gear. Tools were decorated with simple geometric designs, lacking the complexity of the contemporary Maglemosian Culture communities to the southwest.

Origin of culture
The Kunda culture appears to have undergone a transition from the Palaeolithic Swiderian culture located previously over much of the same range. One such transition settlement, Pasieniai 1C in Lithuania, features stone tools of both Late Swiderian and early Kunda. One shape manufactured in both cultures is the retouched tanged point. The final Swiderian is dated 7800–7600 BC by calibrated radiocarbon dating, which is in the Preboreal period, at the end of which time with no gap the early Kunda begins. Evidently the descendants of the Swiderians were the first to settle Estonia when it became habitable. Other post-Swiderian groups extended as far east as the Ural mountains.

Genetics
Jones et al. (2017) determined, in one example (6467-6250 BC) of the Kunda culture and another of the succeeding Narva culture, closer genetic affinity with Western Hunter-Gatherers (WHGs) than Eastern Hunter-Gatherers (EHGs).

Mittnik et al. (2018) analyzed the remains of a male and female ascribed to the Kunda culture. They found the male to be carrying haplogroup I and U5b2c1, while the female carried U4a2. They were found to have "a very close affinity" with WHGs, although with "a significant contribution" from Ancient North Eurasians (ANE). Their ANE ancestry was lower than that of Scandinavian Hunter-Gatherers, indicating that ANE ancestry entered Scandinavia without traversing the Baltic.

Matthieson et al. (2018) analyzed a large number of individuals buried at the Zvejnieki burial ground, most of whom were affiliated with the Kunda culture and the succeeding Narva culture. The mtDNA belonged to haplotypes U5, U4 and U2, the vast majority of the Y-DNA samples belonged to R1b1a1a and I2a1. The results affirmed that the Kunda and Narva cultures were about 70% WHG and 30% EHG. The nearby contemporary Pit–Comb Ware culture was on the contrary found to be about 65% EHG.

Around 3700/3600 BC there was a complete turnover to now y-hg R1a1a1, from 900/800 onward mainly in Estonia with increasing impact of y-hg N1a1 (Mittnik 2018, Saag 2019, and others).

Locations of sites
 Kunda, Estonia
 Pulli, Estonia
 Luga
 Pasieniai, Lithuania
 Ristola, Finland
 Velizh
 Zvejnieki, Latvia

Citations and references

Cited sources
 
 
 

Archaeological cultures of Eastern Europe
Mesolithic cultures of Europe
Archaeological cultures in Belarus
Archaeological cultures in Estonia
Archaeological cultures in Finland
Archaeological cultures in Latvia
Archaeological cultures in Lithuania
Archaeological cultures in Russia
Stone Age Latvia
Peopling of Europe
9th-millennium BC establishments